The 1992 Belarusian Cup was the inaugural season of the annual Belarusian football cup competition. It began on 6 May 1992 with the preliminary round and ended on 24 June 1992 with the final at the Dinamo Stadium in Minsk.

FC Dinamo Minsk won the final against FC Dnepr Mogilev to win their first title.

Preliminary round
The games were played on 6 May 1992.

|}

Round of 32
The games were played on 13 May 1992.

|}

Round of 16
The games were played on 20 May 1992.

|}

Quarterfinals
The games were played on 27 May 1992.

|}

Semifinals
The games were played on 3 June 1992.

|}

Final
The final match was played on 24 June 1992 at the Dinamo Stadium in Minsk.

External links
 RSSSF

Belarusian Cup seasons
Belarusian Cup
Cup